The is a list of provosts of Perth.  Perth is a city in Scotland, and the role of provost is similar to that of a mayor in many other countries.

History
The Merchant Guild of Perth was chartered in 1210, and the post of provost may have originated at this point.  The first holder whose name is known is John Mercer, who served in 1368.

Until 1975, the post was Lord Provost of Perth, and ranked second in precedence after the Lord Provost of Edinburgh.  With the reorganisation of local government, it became Provost of Perth and Kinross.

List of Provosts
1368: John Mercer
 Laurence Spence
 William Mercer
 Andrew de Martyn
 John de Pitscottie
1465: Andrew Charteris
1471: Robert Donyng
 Andrew de Martyn
 Richard de Strathearn
 Alexander Bunch
 Thomas Peebles
 Robert Mercer
 Walter Ireland
 Patrick Wells

1500: Patrick Wells
 Robert Mercer
 Andrew Charteris
 John Charteris
 Alexander Tyre, of Busbie
 Andrew Bunch
1504: Alexander Blair
1509: John Donyng
1521: Patrick Charteris
1523: Alexander M'Breck
 William, Lord Ruthven
 Oliver Maxton
 John Christison
 William Patullo
1544: Patrick Ruthven
1584: Patrick, Master of Ruthven
 Sir William Murray, of Tullibardine
 William, Earl of Gowrie
 John, Earl of Montrose
 John, Earl of Atholl
 James Hepburn
 James, Earl of Gowrie
 John, Earl of Gowrie

1600: David Murray, afterwards Lord Scone
 James Adamson
 Viscount Stormont
 Alexander Peebles
 Robert Arnot
 Andrew Gray
 Andrew Grant
 Andrew Butter
 John Paterson
1664: Sir Patrick Threipland
1666: George Threipland
 Archibald Christie
 Andrew Jackson
 Patrick Hay
 Robert Lauder
 John Glas
 Robert Smyth
 George Oliphant
 James Cree
 David Murray
 Patrick Davidson

1700: George Oliphant
 Patrick Davidson
1704: Alexander Robertson
1706: James Cree
 James Brown
 William Austen
 Robert Robertson
 Patrick Hay
 William Ferguson
 Colin Brown
 Patrick Crie
 John Robertson
 William Stuart
 William Gray
 John Stuart
 Alexander Simpson
 George Fechney
 Thomas Marshall
 William Alison
 John Caw
 Alexander Fechney
 James Ramsay
 Thomas Black
1802: Thomas Hay Marshall
1806:
1839: David Greig
1841:
1867: John Pullar
1873: 
1890: George Wilson
1893: John Dewar
1899:
1912: Charles Scott
1919:
1922: John Dewar
1924:
1932: Thomas Hunter
1935: Robert Nimmo
1945: John Ure Primrose
1954: John Buchan
John T. Young
1963: Robert Ritchie
1966: David Kinnear Thomson
1972: Alexander Cross
1975:
John Mathieson
1988: Alexander Murray
19??:
John Cullivan
1999: Mike O'Malley
2003: Bob Scott
2007: John Hulbert
2012: Liz Grant
2017: Dennis Melloy
2022: Xander McDade

References

Politics of Perth, Scotland
Perth, Provost of